Pentium Centrino may refer to:

 Pentium M, the Intel microprocessor
 Centrino, the combination of Intel Pentium M, 855 and PRO/Wireless chipsets